On Wings of Eagles (also known as  Teheran) is a 1986 American television miniseries starring Burt Lancaster and Richard Crenna, and directed by Andrew V. McLaglen. It was adapted from Ken Follett's 1983 book of the same name.

Synopsis 
The story is set during the Iranian Revolution (1978–1979). As Shah Mohammad Reza Pahlavi is overthrown by Ayatollah Ruhollah Khomeini in the takeover of Iran, two executives of Electronic Data Systems, are arrested on false charges and then imprisoned. The head of the company, H. Ross Perot (Richard Crenna), travels to Tehran to negotiate for their release. Meanwhile, a retired US Army Special Forces Colonel, Arthur D. 'Bull' Simons (Burt Lancaster), is hired by Perot to formulate a rescue plan at any cost.

Cast

Awards

The miniseries was nominated for Outstanding Miniseries at the 38th Primetime Emmy Awards.

References 
Burt Lancaster: An American Life, by Kate Buford

External links 

1986 American television series debuts
1986 American television series endings
1980s American television miniseries
1986 television films
1986 films
Adaptations of works by Ken Follett
English-language television shows
Films set in Iran
Films shot in Mexico
Iranian Revolution films
Ross Perot
Television series set in 1978
Television series set in 1979
Television shows set in Iran
Films directed by Andrew McLaglen
Films scored by Laurence Rosenthal